Brigadier Robert Adolphus George Tilney,  (2 November 1903 – May 1981) was a British Army officer who served during the Second World War.

Military career
Robert Tilney was a Territorial Army officer, formerly of the Leicestershire Yeomanry. He was the son of Colonel William Arthur Tilney and Hylda Sophia Paget.

On 5 November 1943 Tilney was appointed to command the British forces on the Greek island of Leros, replacing Major-General F.G.R. Brittorous. He had under his command the 234th Infantry Brigade and an assortment of Royal Air Force and Italian Navy troops. The island of Leros was invaded by German forces on 12 November 1943 and Tilney surrendered on 16 November. Tilney spent the rest of the war as a POW in camp Oflag IX-A/H in Germany. His POW number there was 1765.

In 1945 he was awarded the Distinguished Service Order and in 1962 he was invested as a Commander of the Order of the British Empire.

References

External links
British Army Officers 1939−1945
Generals of World War II

British Army brigadiers of World War II
British World War II prisoners of war
World War II prisoners of war held by Germany
Royal Artillery officers
Deputy Lieutenants of Leicestershire
Leicestershire Yeomanry officers
Dodecanese campaign
Commanders of the Order of the British Empire
Military personnel from Edinburgh